A.F. Budge was a British civil engineering and construction company based in Nottinghamshire. It built many sections of motorway in Yorkshire and the north Midlands.

History
Tony Budge went to Boston Grammar School, where he gained O-levels in English, English Literature, French, German, History, Geography,
Maths, and Physics with Chemistry in 1955.

It was established by Tony Budge (August 1939 - 3 February 2010) in December 1962. He was the older brother of Richard Budge, who established his coal mining business RJB Mining, also based in Bassetlaw. Richard Budge joined the company in 1966. Another director of the company was Janet Budge, Tony's wife.

The company turned over £1.5m in 1968. In January 1969, the Charterhouse Group bought 23% of the company. The company hoped to go public in the early 1970s. Tony Budge was given an OBE in the 1985 New Year Honours. In 1990, Tony Budge was Chairman of the Federation of Civil Engineering Contractors.

RJB Mining was formed from a management buyout in February 1992 for £107m.

Mining
The company had an opencast mine in the 1970s at Esh Winning and West Chevington (Northumberland). In the early 1990s, it opened the Whitehouse Colliery, near the former Fontburn Halt railway station. 

In 1991, it operated nine opencast mines. In August 1991, British Coal Opencast gave the company a £16m contract for its Colliersdean site in Northumberland.

Horseracing
Anthony Frederick Budge liked racehorses, and his company invested in Doncaster Racecourse. Danish Flight won the Arkle Challenge Trophy at Cheltenham in 1988; Rock City, ridden by Willie Carson, won the Coventry Stakes at Ascot in 1989; Sharp N' Early won the Gimcrack Stakes at York in 1988 and the Leisure Stakes at Windsor in 1990; Rock City with Willie Carson won the Gimcrack Stakes in 1989 and River Falls won the race in 1991; Uncle Ernie won the Lightning Novices' Chase at Doncaster in 1991; Showbrook won the Woodcote Stakes at Epsom in 1991. In the early 1990s, he had 20 horses with trainer Jimmy FitzGerald.

The company owned Retford Gamston Airport. Tony Budge lived at Osberton Hall at Scofton (in Worksop), the former home of Francis Ferrand Foljambe, near the River Ryton, off the B6079 between Worksop and Retford.

Receivership
A.F. Budge (Road Materials) Ltd went into well-publicised receivership on 9 December 1992, undertaken by Cork Gully, with £96.6m debts, under the Insolvency Act 1986. As a road construction company, it was profitable, but the company made some disastrous investments in other areas in the late 1980s. During 1992 the company had reduced its debt by £30m, but blamed Barclays Bank for forcing it into receivership. 

The company, and RJB Mining, were investigated in the King Coal edition of Panorama on 1 May 1995. The civil engineering business was bought by Alfred McAlpine in January 1993.

Structure
The company, also known as A. F. Budge (Contractors), was based in Retford (Ordsall) in Bassetlaw, north Nottinghamshire, directly west of Retford railway station.

Products

It built the Central Business and Technology Park in central Newcastle next to the A167(M) and the A193 junction; this became King's nor Central Business and Technology Park, on the site of a former railway station. Universal Building Society moved its HQ there in June 1992.
It built the Eureka! (museum) in West Yorkshire in the early 1990s.

Universities
In January 1991, it had a £14m contract for Newcastle Science Park (5.5 acres), which is next to Manors Metro station and Manors railway station, with a 284-vehicle car park; it received £2.5m from the Tyne and Wear Development Corporation, with the Chief Executive being Alastair Balls; Michael Portillo dug the first section on Thursday 21 February 1991.

Roads
It built many bypasses including the A46 bypasses for Newark-on-Trent (Newark Relief Road) and Lincoln (Lincoln Relief Road).
 A1 Darrington grade separation (1978)
 A15 Humber Bridge north approach, and toll plaza (1978)
 A1079 Beverley bypass
 A180 Brigg-Ulceby (1983)
 A38 Sutton-in-Ashfield bypass (1989)
 A41 Kings Langley bypass (1993, after bankruptcy)
 A47 Norwich bypass, Trowse to Postwick section
 A516 Etwall bypass (1992)
 A52 Sherwin Arms Junction improvement (1991/92)
 A610 Kimberly-Eastwood bypass (1974)
 A611 Hucknall Bypass (southern section, went bankrupt in December 1992, completed by Alfred McAlpine)
 A650 Drighlington bypass (1991)
 Willen Lake H5 in Milton Keynes
 M181 Brumby Common Link (1978) 
 M621

References

 Times 9 February 1995, page 5

External links
 Newark Advertiser

1992 disestablishments in England
British companies established in 1962
British companies disestablished in 1992
British racehorse owners and breeders
Companies based in Nottinghamshire
Construction and civil engineering companies established in 1962
Construction and civil engineering companies of England
Defunct construction and civil engineering companies
Retford